The 2011 Fifth Third Bank Tennis Championships was a professional tennis tournament played on hard courts. It was the 17th edition of the tournament which was part of the 2011 ATP Challenger Tour and the 12th edition for the 2011 ITF Women's Circuit. It took place in Lexington, Kentucky, United States between 18 and 24 July 2011.

ATP singles main-draw entrants

Seeds

 1 Rankings are as of July 11, 2011.

Other entrants
The following players received wildcards into the singles main draw:
  Alexis Musialek
  Eric Quigley
  Jack Sock
  Rhyne Williams

The following players received entry from the qualifying draw:
  Devin Britton
  Chase Buchanan
  Michael McClune
  Blake Strode

The following players received entry as a lucky loser into the singles main draw:
  Jordan Cox

WTA singles main-draw entrants

Seeds

 1 Rankings are as of July 11, 2011.

Other entrants
The following players received wildcards into the singles main draw:
  Robin Anderson
  Nicole Gibbs
  Melanie Oudin

The following players received entry from the qualifying draw:
  Hilary Barte
  Lauren Embree
  Amanda Fink
  Grace Min

Champions

Men's singles

 Wayne Odesnik def.  James Ward, 7–5, 6–4

Women's singles

 Chichi Scholl def.  Amanda Fink, 6–1, 6–1

Men's doubles

 Jordan Kerr /  David Martin def.  James Ward /  Michael Yani, 6–3, 6–4

Women's doubles

 Tamaryn Hendler /  Chichi Scholl def.  Lindsay Lee-Waters /  Megan Moulton-Levy, 7–6(11–9), 3–6, [10–7]

External links
Official Website
Men's ITF Search 
Women's ITF Search 
ATP official site

Fifth Third Bank Tennis Championships
Fifth Third Bank Tennis Championships
2011
Fifth Third Bank Tennis Championships